Sathyan Madakkara (or Satyan M.) is a poet in Malayalam literature.

Biography 

His published collection of poems are Manal (sand), Kappalillatha turamukham (port without ship) and Oru malsyavum jalashayam nirmikkunnilla (No fish makes any lake). - published by DC Books.

References 

Malayalam-language writers
Malayalam poets
1962 births
Living people
People from Kozhikode district
Poets from Kerala
Emirati people of Malayali descent
Indian male poets